Phillip Pratt (born May 12, 1955) is an American politician who has served in the Kentucky House of Representatives from the 62nd district since 2017.

Pratt is a registered Republican and has served as an official for four years as of 2021.

Education

Phillip Pratt graduated from the University of Kentucky College of Law.

References

1955 births
Living people
Republican Party members of the Kentucky House of Representatives
People from Georgetown, Kentucky
21st-century American politicians